The AMsterdamsche en ROtterdamsche Bank (AMRO Bank , "Bank of Amsterdam and Rotterdam") was a major Dutch bank that was created in 1964 by the merger of the Amsterdamsche Bank (est. 1871) and the Rotterdamsche Bank (est. 1863). In 1991, it merged with Algemene Bank Nederland (ABN) to form ABN AMRO.

Amsterdamsche Bank

It expanded rapidly from its base in Amsterdam to other cities in the Netherlands.

Its elegant art nouveau head office building on Herengracht 597-601, designed by Eduard Cuypers and completed in 1897, was demolished in 1966. A subsequent  on Rembrandtplein, designed by Bert Johan Ouëndag and completed in 1932, is a notable art deco landmark of Amsterdam.

Rotterdamsche Bank

After a difficult start, however, the bank soon focused on domestic business. Between 1911 and 1947 it was known as the Union Bank of Rotterdam ( of Robaver), following its 1911 acquisition of Rotterdam competitor  (est. 1900) and soon afterwards of Amsterdam brokers  (est. 1765). Under the leadership of its ambitious managing director , it went on to acquire a number of local banks, but became overextended and had to be restructured under the aegis of De Nederlandsche Bank in the mid-1920s. In 1960, it acquired Nationale Handelsbank, a major former colonial bank that had been known until 1950 as the Dutch-Indian Trade Bank (NIHB; est. 1863).

1964 merger and subsequent history

As early as 1939, there had been plans to merge the two banks but the banks shelved these plans in anticipation of Dutch involvement in World War II.

As soon as the AMRO Bank was set up, it set about gaining market share in business lending, leasing and factoring as well as in medium to long term credit. To do this it established the Nationale Bank voor Middellang Krediet business unit to provide medium to long term credit. It established or acquired companies such as Mahuko (Society for leasing) and Amstel Lease for its leasing business. The financing of factoring was brought together under the International Factors Nederland B.V., the oldest factoring company in the Netherlands.

In the 1960s and 1970s, like many other banking companies, AMRO saw growth in retail banking and this became a much bigger part of the business. Its wholesale banking was also strengthened by the acquisition of Pierson, Heldring & Pierson (PHP) in 1975. AMRO operated PHP as an independent unit under its existing name. Another acquisition was Utrecht based Bank Flaors & Ko, which had been in existence since 1691. This bank was absorbed under the AMRO Bank brand.

In 1967, AMRO Bank was one of the founders of the consortium bank Banque Européenne de Crédit à Moyen Terme (European bank of long term credit) based in Belgium. The aim was create an entity that was large enough to work at an international level.

Soon after this, with their sights on European integration, AMRO Bank announced plans to collaborate with Belgian Generale Bank with the aim of building a European international bank. However, this project was too ambitious and never managed to get off the ground.

It was only when the Dutch Government announced that it was relaxing its merger rules for financial institutions that ABN and AMRO Bank were able to seize the opportunity to merge and to create a bank large enough to fulfill these ambitions. On 24 August 1990, ABN AMRO was created by the conversion of the shares of both banks into shares of the newly established ABN AMRO Holding N.V.

See also

 Rabobank

References

Defunct banks of the Netherlands
Banks established in 1964
ABN AMRO
1964 mergers and acquisitions